The Portuguese Albums Chart ranks the best-performing albums in Portugal, as compiled by the Associação Fonográfica Portuguesa.

See also
List of number-one singles of 2023 (Portugal)

References

Number one albums
Portugal
Albums 2023